Dretch may refer to:

A type of small alien in the game Tremulous
Dretch, a type of demon in the Dungeons & Dragons role-playing game